Little Demon may refer to: 

 Little Demon (song) - song by Frank Ocean
 Little Demon (Soul Eater) - Soul Eater character
 Little Demon (TV series) - TV series